Santo Domingo de Morelos is a town and municipality in Oaxaca in south-western Mexico. The municipality covers an area of 107.17 km². It is part of the Pochutla District in the east of the Costa Region.

In 2005, the municipality had a total population of 8,751.

References

Municipalities of Oaxaca